Ajmer Lok Sabha constituency is one of the 25 Lok Sabha (parliamentary) constituencies in Rajasthan state in India.

Vidhan Sabha segments
Presently, Ajmer Lok Sabha constituency comprises eight Vidhan Sabha (legislative assembly) segments. These are:

Members of Lok Sabha

Prior to independence

Post-independence

Election Results

2019

2018 Bye-poll

2014

2009 Lok Sabha Election

2004 Lok Sabha Election

1991

1962 Lok Sabha Election
 Mukatbehari Lal (INC) : 92,598 votes  
 Bhagwandas (Jana Sangh) : 60,455

See also
 Ajmer district
 List of Constituencies of the Lok Sabha

Notes

Ajmer
Lok Sabha constituencies in Rajasthan